Matthew Carraro (born 4 August 1984) is an Australian former professional rugby union player. His usual positions were at centre or on the wing.

Family and early life
Matthew Carraro was born in Gosford, New South Wales. He is the nephew of former Avoca and Manly player at tighthead prop David Carraro. He attended St Joseph's College, Hunters Hill and was selected for the Australian Schools team in 2002.

Carraro is married and has two children (a son and a daughter) with his wife Nardia.

Career
Carraro was selected for the Australia A team to play in the 2008 Pacific Nations Cup.

He joined Bath Rugby in 2009, signing a two-year extension in summer 2011. In March 2012, he confirmed that he would be leaving Bath for Montpellier at the end of the season.

He played in Sydney until the end of the 2016 Super Rugby season. His season for the Waratahs was such a success, he was nicknamed "Mr fix-it" for revitalising the Waratahs wing.

He joined with French club Toulon as a replacement for the injured Ayumu Goromaru for the 2016–17 Top 14 season but was then signed on to a full season contract, for what was his last season of professional rugby.

Following his retirement from the top level of the game, Carraro pursued his teaching career in physical education at Newington College in Sydney.

References

External links
Stats on It's Rugby

Bath Rugby profile

1984 births
Living people
Australian rugby union players
Rugby union centres
Rugby union wings
New South Wales Waratahs players
New South Wales Country Eagles players
ACT Brumbies players
Montpellier Hérault Rugby players
RC Toulonnais players
Bath Rugby players
People educated at St Joseph's College, Hunters Hill
Staff of Newington College
Rugby union players from Sydney
Expatriate rugby union players in France
Expatriate rugby union players in England
Australian expatriate sportspeople in France
Australian expatriate sportspeople in England